The Baroda, Western India and Gujarat States Agency was an agency of the Indian Empire, managing the relations of the Provincial Government of the Bombay Presidency with a collection of princely states.

The political agent in charge of the agency resided at Baroda (Vadodara).

History 

In 1937 the princely states of the Baroda Agency were merged with those of the agencies adjacent to the northern part of the Bombay Presidency, Rewa Kantha Agency, Surat Agency, Nasik Agency, Kaira Agency and Thana Agency, in order to form the Baroda and Gujarat States Agency.
On 5 November 1944 the Baroda and Gujarat States Agency was merged with the Western India States Agency (WISA) to form the larger Baroda, Western India and Gujarat States Agency.

After the Independence of India in 1947, as India and Pakistan, the rulers of the princely states of the agency signed the Instrument of Accession and joined India. Only a few princely states such as Junagadh and (Bantva) Manavadar lingering over joining Pakistan. Finally following the accession to India the territories managed by the agency were integrated into the following newly created states:
 Saurashtra State, first named 'United States of Kathiawar', which included the former princely states on the Kathiawar Peninsula.
 Kutch State, former princely Cutch State.
 Bombay State

On 1 November 1956, Bombay State was re-organized under the States Reorganisation Act, absorbing various territories including the Saurashtra and Kutch States, which ceased to exist. Bombay State was split along linguistic lines in 1960, and some princely states which had formerly belonged to this agency became part of Gujarat and others of Maharashtra.

Residents at Baroda for Western India and Gujarat States Agency 
 5 Nov 1944 -  6 May 1947 Sir Cyril Percy Hancock        (**.)  (acting to 5 Nov 1944)
 7 May 1947 – 14 Aug 1947 Leonard George Coke-Wallis     (b. 1900 - d. 1974)

Princely states 
The number of separate princely states was above 250, but most were minor or petty states, some not even included here. Some of them had been integrated after 1940 during the 'attachment scheme' right before the creation of the agency; the largest one was Baroda State, which merged with Bombay State in 1949.

Former Baroda and Gujarat States Agency

Former Baroda Agency 

Salute state :
 Baroda State, title Maharaja Gaekwar, Hereditary salute of 21-guns

Non-salute states :
 
 Agar
 Bhadli 
 Bhilodia
 Charkha
 Dadhalia
 Derdi
 Derol
 Gabat
 Gad Boriad
 Gadhula
 Hapa
 Ilol
 Jafrabad
 Jambughoda 
 Mandwa
 Nahara 
 Noghavandar
 Palaj
 Palasni
 Rupal
 Sihora 
 Vajiria
 ?Vasan Sawada State 
 Veja
 Vithalgadh

Former Rewa Kantha Agency 

Salute states :
 First Class : Rajpipla (Nandod), title Maharaja, Hereditary salute of 13-guns
 Second Class :
 Bari(y)a (Devgadh), title Maharaol, Hereditary salute of 9-guns (11 personal)
 Balasinor, title Nawab, Hereditary salute of 9-guns
 Chhota Udaipur, title Raja, Hereditary salute of 9-guns
 Lunavada (Lunawada), title Maharana, Hereditary salute of 9-guns
 Sant (Sunth), title Raja, Hereditary salute of 9-guns

Non-salute states :
 Major Mehwas
 Chhota Udehpur (Mohan), Second Class
 Kadana, Third Class
 Sanjeli, Third Class
 Jambughoda (Narukot), Third Class
 Bhadarva (Bhadarwa), Third Class
 Gad Boriad, Third Class (personal) / Fourth Class
 Mandwa, Third Class (personal) / Fourth Class
 Umet(h)a, Third (personal) / Fourth Class
 Shanor, Fourth Class
 Vajiria, Fourth Class
 Vanmala, Fourth Class (personal) / Fifth Class
 Nangam, Fifth Class
 Sihora, Fourth Class
 Pandu, Fifth Class

 minor Mehwas (petty (e)states), in two geographical divisions
Sankheda :

 Agar 
 Alwa 
 Bhilodia :
 Motisinghji, 
 Chhatarsinghji 
 Bihora 
 Chorangla 
 Dudhpur 
 Chudesar 
 Jiral Kamsoli 
 Nalia
 Naswadi 
 Palasni 
 Pantalavdi : 
 Akbar Khan,
 Kesar Khan 
 Rampura 
 Regan 
 Sindiapura 
 Uchad 
 Vadia (Virampura) 
 Vasan Sewada 
 Vasan Virpur 
 Vo(h)ra 

Pandu (incl. Dorka estates) :

 Amrapur 
 Angadh 
 Chhaliar 
 Dhari 
 Dorka 
 Gotardi 
 Itwad 
 Jesa 
 Jumkha 
 Kalsa Pagi nu Muvadu 
 Kanoda
 Litter Gothda 
 Mevli 
 Moka Pagi nu Muvadu 
 Moti Varnol 
 Nani Varnol 
 Poicha 
 Rayka (Raika)
 Rajpur, 
 Vakhtapur 
 Varnolmal

Smaller former Gujurati agencies 
Former Kaira Agency :
Salute state :
 Cambay, title Nawab, Hereditary salute of 11-guns

Former Nasik Agency :
 Non-salute state : Surgana

Former Surat Agency :

Salute states :
 Dharampur, title Raja, Hereditary salute of 9-guns (11 personal)
 Sachin, title Nawab, Hereditary salute of 9-guns

Non-salute state : 
 Bansda

Former Thana Agency :
Salute state :
 Jawhar, title Maharaja, Hereditary salute of 9-guns

Former Western States Agency

Former Eastern Kathiawar Agency 
Salute states :
 Bhavnagar, title maharaja, Hereditary salute of 13-guns (15-guns local)
 Dhrangadhra, title Maharaja Raj Sahib, Hereditary salute of 13-guns
 Limbdi, title Thakore Sahib, Hereditary salute of 9-guns
 Palitana, title Thakore Sahib, Hereditary salute of 9-guns
 Wadhwan, title Maharana, Hereditary salute of 9-guns

Non-salute states : 
 Akadia 
 Alampur
 Anandpur
 Ankevalia 
 Babra 
 Bajana
 Bamanbore 
 Bhadli
 Bhadvana 
 Bhalala 
 Bhalgamda
 Bhandaria 
 Bharejda 
 Bhathan 
 Bhimora
 Bhoika
 Bhojavadar
 Bildi 
 Bodanones 
 Chachana 
 Chamardi
 Chhalala
 Chiroda
 Chitravav
 Chobari 
 Chok
 Chotila
 Chuda
 Darod
 Dasada
 Datha
 Dedarda
 Derdi-Janbai 
 Devlia 
 Dhola
 Dudhrej 
 Gadhali
 Gadhoola
 Gamph
 Gandhol
 Iavej
 Itaria
 Jakhan 
 Jalia Amaraji
 Jalia Manaji
 Jamar 
 Jasdan
 Jaska
 Jhampodad 
 Jhinjhuvada 
 Juna Padar 
 Kamadhia
 Kamalpur 
 Kanjarda
 Kantharia 
 Kariana
 Karmad
 Karol 
 Katodia
 Kesria 
 Khambhlav 
 Khandia 
 Kherali 
 Khijadia
 Khijadia Dosaji
 Kotra Pitha
 Lakhtar
 Laliyad 
 Lathi
 Limbda
 Matra Timba 
 Mevasa 
 Muli 
 Munjpur 
 Nilvala 
 Pachhegam
 Pah
 Palali 
 Paliyad 
 Panchavada
 Patdi
 Rai-Sankli 
 Rajpara
 Rajpur
 Ramanka
 Ramparda 
 Randhia 
 Ranigam 
 Ratanpur Dhamanka
 Rohisala 
 Samadhiala 
 Samadhiala (Chabharia) 
 Samadhiala (Charan) 
 Samla 
 Sahuka
 Sanala 
 Sanosra
 Satanones 
 Sayla
 Sejakpur 
 Shevdivadar 
 Songadh
 Sudamda-Dhandalpur
 Talsana 
 Tavi 
 Toda Todi
 Untdi 
 Vadal 
 Vadod
 Vala 
 Vana 
 Vanala 
 Vangadhra
 Vanod
 Vavdi Dharvala
 Vavdi Vachhani
 Vijanones 
 Vithalgadh 
 Yankia

Former Western Kathiawar Agency 

Salute states :
 Junagadh , title Nawab, Hereditary salute of 13-guns (15 local and personal)
 Nawanagar, title Maharaja Jam Rahib, Hereditary salute of 13-guns (15 local) 
 Porbandar, title Maharaja Rana Rahib, Hereditary salute of 13-guns
 Gondal, title Maharaja, Hereditary salute of 11-guns
 Morvi, title Maharaja, Hereditary salute of 11-guns
 Wankaner, title Maharaja Raj Rahib, Hereditary salute of 11-guns
 Dhrol, title Thakore Sahib, Hereditary salute of 9-guns
 Rajkot, title Thakore Sahib, Hereditary salute of 9-guns

Non-salute states :
 Amrapur 
 Bagasra
 Bantva 
 Bantva Manavadar 
 Bhadva
 Bhalgam Baldhoi
 Charkha
 Dahida 
 Dedan
 Dholarva
 Drafa
 Gadhka
 Gadhia
 Garmali Moti 
 Garmali Nani 
 Gavridad
 Gigasaran 
 Halaria 
 Jalia Devani
 Jafarabad
 Jamka 
 Jetpur
 Kaner 
 Kanksiali
 Kanpar Ishwaria 
 Kathrota 
 Khijadia Najani
 Khirasra
 Kotda Nayani
 Kotda Sangan
 Kotharia
 Kuba
 Lakhapadar 
 Lodhika
 Malia
 Manavav 
 Mengni
 Monvel 
 Mowa
 Mulila Deri
 Pal
 Rajpara
 Satodad Vavdi
 Shahpur
 Silana 
 Sisang Chandli
 Vadali
 Vaghvadi 
 Vekaria 
 Vinchhavad 
 Virpur-Kherdi
 Virvao
 Vasavad

former Banas Kantha Agency

Former Palanpur Agency 
Salute states :
 Cutch, title Maharao, Hereditary salute of 17-guns (19-guns local)
 Palanpur, title Nawab, Hereditary salute of 13-guns (1933 transferred to Rajputana)
 Radhanpur, title Nawab, Hereditary salute of 11-guns

Non-salute states :
 Bhabbar
 Chadchat
 Deodar (Diyodar)
 Kankrej
 Kankrej thana
 Morwara
 Santalpur
 Suigaon
 Terwara
 Tharad
 Wao 
 Warahi

Former Mahi Kantha Agency 
 Salute states 
 First Class state : Idar, title (Maha)Raja, 15-guns, covering over half of the territory of the agency.
 Second Class state : Danta, title Maharana, 9-guns

 Non-Salute states 
 Third Class states 

 Malpur
 Mansa
 Mohanpur
 ? Ranasan Town

 Fourth Class states 

 Ambliara
 Ghodasar
 Ilol
 Katosan
 Khadal
 Pethapur
 Punadra
 Ranasan
 Sudasna
 Varsoda

 Fifth Class states 

 Dabha
 Dadhalia
 Magodi
 Rupal
 Sathamba
 Tunadar
 Valasna
 Vasna (Wasna)
 Wadagam

 Sixth Class states 

 Bhalusna
 Bolundra
 Dedhrota
 Derol
 Hadol
 Hapa
 Kadoli
 Khedwada
 Likhi
 Prempur
 Ramas
 Satlasna
 Tajpuri
 Vakhtapur

 Seventh Class states 

 Deloli
 Gabat
 Ijpura
 Kasalpura
 Mahmadpura
 Palaj
 Rampura
 Ranipura
 Tejpura
 Timba
 Umri
 Virsoda

 Lesser Estates 
The agency included as well a large number of estates belonging to Kolis and/or Rajput, formerly feudatories of the Gaekwar Baroda; several of the states paid tribute to Baroda, and some, being classed as non-jurisdictional thalukdars, were under British administration.

See also 
 Attachment Scheme
 Bombay Presidency
 Political integration of India

References 

History of Gujarat
Bombay Presidency
Agencies of British India